Carl Jerome Hopprich (born 7 March 1996) is a German-born Seychellois football player. He plays for Hertha Zehlendorf and Seychelles.

International
He made his Seychelles national football team debut on 2 June 2016 in an Africa Cup of Nations qualifier against Algeria.

References

External links
 
 

1996 births
German people of Seychellois descent
People with acquired Seychellois citizenship
Living people
Seychellois footballers
Seychelles international footballers
Hertha Zehlendorf players
Association football midfielders